In Australian Aboriginal folklore, Puckowe is the Grandmother spirit who lives in the sky and comes to the aid of medicine men.

References 

 Myths and Legends of the Australian Aborigines

Australian Aboriginal mythology